Limebank is an under construction terminal station on the Trillium Line in Ottawa, Ontario. When constructed, it will be the southern terminus of the Stage 2 O-Train expansion and is scheduled for completion in 2023. The station will be elevated with two side platforms and is located southwest of the intersection of Limebank and Earl Armstrong roads.

References

Trillium Line stations
Railway stations scheduled to open in 2023